The 2014 Ladies Tour of Norway was the first edition of the Ladies Tour of Norway, a women's cycling stage race in Norway. It was rated by the UCI as a category 2.2 race.

Stages

Prologue
15 August 2014 – Halden to Halden,

Stage 1
16 August 2014 – Strømstad to Halden,

Stage 2
17 August 2014 – Fredriksten Fortress to Fredriksten Fortress,

Classification progress

References

Women's road bicycle races
2014 in women's road cycling
2014 in Norwegian sport